Imbricariopsis is a genus of sea snails, marine gastropod mollusks in the family Mitridae.

Species
Species within the genus Imbricariopsis include:
 Imbricariopsis carbonacea (Hinds, 1844)
 Imbricariopsis conovula (Quoy & Gaimard, 1833)
 Imbricariopsis punctata (Swainson, 1821)
 Imbricariopsis vanikorensis (Quoy & Gaimard, 1833)

References

External links
  Fedosov A., Puillandre N., Herrmann M., Kantor Yu., Oliverio M., Dgebuadze P., Modica M.V. & Bouchet P. (2018). The collapse of Mitra: molecular systematics and morphology of the Mitridae (Gastropoda: Neogastropoda). Zoological Journal of the Linnean Society. 1-85

Mitridae
Gastropod genera